Buxar railway station is a railway station in Buxar district, Bihar, India. Its code is BXR. It serves Buxar city. The station consists of 3 platforms. Buxar is connected to the state capital Patna by rail routes and there are direct trains from Buxar to the metro cities of India like Bangalore, Delhi, Jaipur, Kolkata, Ahmedabad, Chennai, Pune, Surat, Hydrerabad, Guwahati and Mumbai.pryagraj , secundrabad, howrah, jammu tawi, chandigarh, yeshwantpur, nagpur

On the enquiry section of Buxar railway station, there is only one counter. There is artwork done in the waiting hall near entrance of the railway station gives a classy look. In the year 2019, Buxar railway station has been renovated very fast. A new overbridge has been associated with a lift system along with escalator installed within. The station lacks basic facilities, such as parking, drinking water, lights, shedding.

Trains 

Several major trains that halt at Buxar station:

References

Railway stations in Buxar district
Danapur railway division